Ognjen Jaramaz (born September 1, 1995) is a Serbian professional basketball player for Bayern Munich of the Basketball Bundesliga (BBL) and the EuroLeague.

Professional career
He began playing basketball in a hometown based club Napredak Kruševac where he stayed until 2006. He then moved to Partizan, playing for the youth categories.

In the summer of 2013, Jaramaz signed a contract with Mega Vizura. He was loaned to Smederevo 1953 for the 2013–14 season, where he made his professional debut. He returned to Mega Vizura in the summer of 2014. He left the club after the end of the 2016–17 season. However, on January 3, 2018, Jaramaz returned to Mega.

In June 2018, Jaramaz signed a two-year contract with Spanish club San Pablo Burgos. 

Jaramaz was loaned to Partizan Belgrade for the second half of the 2018–2019 campaign and then spent the subsequent two seasons with the Serbian powerhouse on a regular transfer.

On July 2, 2021, Jaramaz signed with Bayern Munich of the German Basketball Bundesliga (BBL) and the EuroLeague.

NBA draft rights 
On June 22, 2017, Jaramaz was selected with the 58th overall pick in the 2017 NBA draft by the New York Knicks. He played for the Knicks during the 2017 NBA Summer League.

Personal life
His older brother Nemanja is also a professional basketball player.

See also 
 List of NBA drafted players from Serbia
 New York Knicks draft history

References

External links
 Ognjen Jaramaz at aba-liga.com
 Ognjen Jaramaz at draftexpress.com
 Ognjen Jaramaz at fiba.com

1995 births
Living people
ABA League players
Basketball League of Serbia players
CB Miraflores players
FC Bayern Munich basketball players
Liga ACB players
KK Mega Basket players
KK Smederevo players
New York Knicks draft picks
Point guards
Serbian expatriate basketball people in Germany
Serbian expatriate basketball people in Spain
Serbian men's basketball players
Serbia men's national basketball team players
Shooting guards
Sportspeople from Kruševac